A Different Kind of Truth (or Viva La Van Halen Tour) was a 2012–13 concert tour for hard rock band Van Halen. It was Van Halen's tour in support of their 2012 album, A Different Kind of Truth.

History
On December 26, 2011, the official Van Halen website was updated, announcing that tickets for the 2012 tour would be available starting January 10, 2012. On January 10, the single "Tattoo" premiered on radio stations. The band's new album from Interscope Records, entitled A Different Kind of Truth, was released on February 7.

The band did three warm-up shows – Cafe Wha? in New York City on January 5, 2012, Henson Recording Studios in Hollywood, California on February 1, and The Forum in Inglewood, California on February 8 – before kicking off the North American leg of the tour in Louisville at KFC Yum! Center on February 18. This leg ended on June 26 at New Orleans Arena. Kool & the Gang opened each show (except Uncasville), through the end of June.

Another North American leg was scheduled to begin July 7 and last until September 25, but was postponed and then cancelled due to the band feeling overworked. Ky-Mani Marley was to open each North American show, starting with the July dates.

By mid year 2012, the tour had grossed $44.9 million with 448,506 total tickets sold. This put Van Halen as the number three tour of the year at that point. The band was scheduled to visit Japan for the first time since their 1998 III Tour with Gary Cherone/since 1979 during their "World Vacation Tour" with David Lee Roth, however, due to Eddie Van Halen's emergency surgery for diverticulitis in August 2012, the Asian tour was rescheduled for June 2013, preceded by the band's first Australia show since 1998 at Stadium Australia in Sydney on April 20, 2013.

The band kicked off the Asian leg at Aichi Prefectural Gymnasium in Nagoya on June 18, followed by a show at the Tokyo Dome on June 21 (released as Tokyo Dome Live in Concert) and ending with two shows at Osaka Municipal Central Gymnasium on June 24 and 26. The band finished the tour with two shows at Ford Festival Park in Oshkosh, Wisconsin for the "Rock USA Festival" on July 20 and at Chumash Grandstand Arena in Paso Robles, California for the "California Mid-State Fair" on July 24.

"I'm happy now when somebody sends me a video of those guys in concert," remarked former singer Sammy Hagar, "and I see Eddie's playing good again. I wish that would have been the guy that did the 2004 tour. If it was, we probably still would have been together."

Setlist

Songs played overall
"Unchained"
"Runnin' with the Devil"
"She's the Woman"
"I'm the One"
"Romeo Delight" 
"The Full Bug"
"Tattoo"
"Everybody Wants Some!!"
"Somebody Get Me a Doctor"
"China Town"
"Mean Street"
"Jamie's Cryin'"
"Hear About It Later"
"Oh, Pretty Woman" (Roy Orbison cover)
Alex Van Halen drum solo ["Drumstruck"]
"You Really Got Me" (The Kinks cover)
"The Trouble with Never"
"Blood & Fire"
"Bottoms Up!"
"Dance the Night Away"
"I'll Wait"
"And the Cradle Will Rock..."
"Hot for Teacher"
"Women in Love..."
"Outta Love Again"
"Girl Gone Bad"
"Hang 'Em High"
"Atomic Punk"
"Beautiful Girls"
"Ice Cream Man" (John Brim cover)
"Panama"
Eddie Van Halen guitar solo and "Spanish Fly", "Cathedral" and "Eruption"]
"Ain't Talkin' 'Bout Love"
Encore
"Jump"

Typical setlist
"Unchained"
"Runnin' with the Devil"
"She's the Woman"
"Romeo Delight"
"Tattoo"
"Everybody Wants Some!!"
"Somebody Get Me a Doctor"
"China Town"
"Hear About It Later"
"Pretty Woman" (Roy Orbison over)
Alex Van Halen drum solo ["Drumstruck"]
"You Really Got Me" (The Kinks cover)
"The Trouble with Never"
"Dance the Night Away"
"I'll Wait"
"Hot for Teacher"
"Women in Love..."
"Beautiful Girls"
"Ice Cream Man" (John Brim cover)
"Panama"
Eddie Van Halen guitar solo" [and "Spanish Fly", "Cathedral" and "Eruption"]
"Ain't Talkin' 'Bout Love"
Encore
"Jump"

Tour dates

Information
Top 200 North American Tours 2012: #8
Total Gross: US $49.9 million
Total Attendance: 485,172
No. of concerts: 50

Festivals and other miscellaneous performances

This concert is a part of the Stone Music Festival
This concert is a part of the Rock USA Festival
This concert is a part of the California Mid-State Fair

A full private show for SAP was played at Orlando Amway Center on May 16, 2012.

Cancellations 
Shows

Legs

Personnel
David Lee Roth – lead vocals, guitar
Eddie Van Halen – lead guitar, backing vocals
Wolfgang Van Halen – bass guitar, backing vocals
Alex Van Halen – drums, percussion

References

External links
 Van-Halen.com – The official Van Halen website
 Van Halen NewsDesk
 A Different Kind of Truth Tour website

Van Halen concert tours
2012 concert tours
2013 concert tours
Kool & the Gang